The Dilimli Dam is a rock-fill embankment dam on the Büyük River, located  northeast of Yüksekova in Hakkari Province, Turkey. Construction on the project began in 1995 after the main contract was awarded in 1994. Development is backed by the Turkish State Hydraulic Works. It was completed in late November 2014. The mayor of Dilimli opposes the dam because of its effects on nature.

See also
List of dams and reservoirs in Turkey

References

Dams in Hakkâri Province
Rock-filled dams
Dams completed in 2014